Annegret Friederike Hannawa (born April 27, 1979 in Konstanz, Germany) is a German communication scientist and founding director of the Center for the Advancement of Healthcare Quality and Safety (CAHQS) at the Università della Svizzera italiana in Lugano.

Studies 
Hannawa studied Interpersonal Communication at San Diego State University (California, USA), where she earned a master's degree in 2006.

She then began her Ph.D. studies at Arizona State University (ASU) in Tempe, Arizona (USA). Her dissertation developed a communication science model of "Physician Mistake Disclosure." In 2009, Hannawa received her doctorate from ASU.

Academic career and work 
After receiving her PhD, Hannawa received her first academic appointment at Wake Forest University (WFU) in Winston-Salem, North Carolina, USA, as a tenure-track assistant professor in the Department of Communication Studies. In 2011, she was appointed to a tenure-track professorship in health communication and research methodology at the Faculty of Communication, Università della Svizzera italiana (USI, Lugano, Switzerland), where she still works today.

Hannawa conducted a grant-funded international congress entitled "Communicating Medical Error (COME)" in 2013. The conference evolved into the nonprofit organization "ISCOME Global Center for the Advancement of Communication Science in Healthcare." To date, Hannawa leads this research association as its founding president-elect. Also in 2013, she received funding from the Swiss National Science Foundation (SNSF) to develop evidence-based communication guidelines for disclosing medical errors to patients.

In 2016, Hannawa founded an interdisciplinary Center for the Advancement of Healthcare Quality and Safety (CAHQS) at the Università della Svizzera italiana. In the same year, she was elected as a scientific expert to the ELSI Advisory Board of the Swiss Personalized Health Network (SPHN). In addition, she received honorary titles as Associate Faculty at Johns Hopkins University Bloomberg School of Public Health (Baltimore, Maryland, USA) and Cardiff University School of Medicine (Wales, United Kingdom). In the same year, she was awarded the "Jozien Bensing Research Award".

Research 
Hannawa's research focuses primarily on how safe interpersonal communication can prevent harmful errors in everyday clinical practice and ensure high-quality healthcare, particularly in the digital age. In her scientific research, she has evaluated over 1000 cases of harm in hospitals. According to her statistics, 53 patients die every day in Germany as a result of treatment errors; up to 80 percent of these cases can be traced back to poor communication.

Awards 

 Jozien Bensing Research Award, 2016.

See also 

 Patient safety
Medical error
Human error
Interpersonal communication
Healthcare quality
 Health Communication
Digitization

References

External links 

 Annegret Hannawa publications indexed by PubMed
Center for the Advancement of Healthcare Quality & Patient Safety (CAHQS)

1979 births
Living people
People from Konstanz
Arizona State University alumni
German women scientists
Patient safety
Interpersonal communication
Medical error
Health care quality
Aviation safety